Milinka Merlini (née Cirović; 24 October 1929 – 29 October 1996) was a Yugoslav–French chess player, five-times French Women's Chess Championship winner (1975, 1976, 1977, 1978, 1980).

Biography
Milinka Merlini lived in Yugoslavia until 1961 before emigrating to France, but she remained eligible to play for the Yugoslav Chess Federation until 1972. She worked as a Russian teacher and translated several works into French.

In 1960 Milinka Merlini won both the Belgrade and Serbian Women's Chess Championships. After moving to France, she won French Women's Chess Championship five times (1975 to 1978 and 1980), and played a key role in its reintroduction after a long break (French Women Chess Championship was not held between 1958 and 1974). In 1973, in Wijk aan Zee Milinka Merlini participated in Women's World Chess Championship Zonal tournament.

Milinka Merlini played for France in the Women's Chess Olympiads:
 In 1976, at first board in the 7th Chess Olympiad (women) in Haifa (+5, =3, -4),
 In 1978, at first board in the 8th Chess Olympiad (women) in Buenos Aires (+3, =2, -7),
 In 1980, at first board in the 9th Chess Olympiad (women) in Valletta (+5, =2, -5),
 In 1986, at first reserve board in the 27th Chess Olympiad (women) in Dubai (+4, =0, -4).

References

External links
Milinka Merlini at heritageechecsfra.free.fr

Milinka Merlini chess games at 365chess.com

1929 births
1996 deaths
People from Zlatibor District
French female chess players
Yugoslav female chess players
Chess Olympiad competitors
20th-century chess players